The Quest for Shakespeare is a television documentary series shown on cable channel EWTN. It is written and presented by author Joseph Pearce about William Shakespeare, and specifically the evidence that his religion was Catholic. The series comprises thirteen episodes that began airing May 2009.  The shows feature dramatizations of pertinent scenes and excerpts from Shakespeare's work by  actors from Theatre of the Word, a theatrical company founded by Father Joseph Fessio.

Episodes

See also
 William Shakespeare's religion

References

External links
 EWTN – The Quest for Shakespeare
  Audio files of The Quest for Shakespeare episodes

Works about William Shakespeare
British documentary television series